Semiluki is a town and the administrative center of Semiluksky District in Voronezh Oblast, Russia, located on the Don River. Population

History
It was founded in 1894 near the Semiluki railway station, which was named after the nearby village. In 1929, the main enterprise of the settlement, a factory of fireproof materials (now JSC "Semiluksky refractory plant"), was built. In 1931, Semiluki became the administrative center of Semiluksky District. In July 1942, it was occupied by Nazi Germany. It was liberated on January 25, 1943. A factory of fireproof materials was almost completely destroyed by the Nazis. Town status was granted to Semiluki in 1954.

Administrative and municipal status
Within the framework of administrative divisions, Semiluki serves as the administrative center of Semiluksky District. As an administrative division, it is incorporated within Semiluksky District as Semiluki Urban Settlement. As a municipal division, this administrative unit also has urban settlement status and is a part of Semiluksky Municipal District.

Informal divisions
As most other towns in Russia, Semiluki is divided into microdistricts for town planning purposes. The microdistricts bear proper names; however, an informal and traditional system of dividing the town into residential areas also exists. Many such areas also have informal names, and some of those names are used in official documents together with, or instead of, the official names. Severny 1 Microdistrict, for example, is commonly known as Pole chudes (lit. the field of wonders).

References

Notes

Sources

External links
Residential areas of Semiluki and their informal names

Cities and towns in Voronezh Oblast
Populated places in Semiluksky District